Eaten Alive! is a 1980 Italian horror film directed by Umberto Lenzi. The film is about a young woman (Janet Agren) who is searching for her sister after her abduction by a cult in the jungles of New Guinea.

Synopsis
A woman named Sheila is searching for her sister, who has disappeared in the jungles of New Guinea. Sheila (Janet Agren) joins up with Mark (Robert Kerman), and they both encounter many perils while searching for Sheila's sister, Diana (Paola Senatore). Diana has joined a cult run by a man called Jonas (Ivan Rassimov). Jonas physically and sexually abuses his followers and local people alike. In one scene, he rapes Sheila with a dildo covered in snake blood, and decapitates a native. In another, a native widow named Mowara (Me Me Lai) is ritualistically raped after her late husband's body is burned on a pyre. A group, consisting of Mowara, Mark, Sheila and Diana escapes into the jungle, where Diana and Mowara are caught by a group of cannibals, with Diana raped and then both slowly cut up and eaten before being hacked to death, while Mark and Sheila helplessly watch from the cover of the bushes. They quickly escape back to New York when helicopters sent by the authorities come looking for them. Back in the village, the rest of the cult commits ritual suicide, leaving one young female survivor for the authorities to find.

Cast
Robert Kerman as Mark Butler
Janet Agren as Sheila
Ivan Rassimov as Jonas Melvin
Paola Senatore as Diana Morris
Me Me Lai as Mowara
Mel Ferrer as Professor Carter
Fiamma Maglione as Alma
Franco Fantasia as Reeves
Franco Coduti as Karan
Michele Schmiegelm as a Native Girl

Production
Eaten Alive! was part of the cannibal boom and filmed before the release of Cannibal Holocaust. The film uses a more traditional adventure film narrative opposed to the mondo film style of previous cannibal films. The film uses footage taken from other cannibal films, including Man from the Deep River (1972), Last Cannibal World (1977) and The Mountain of the Cannibal God (1978).

Release
The film was released in Italy on March 20, 1980. It was released under the alternative title Doomed to Die in the United States.

Reception
From contemporary reviews, the Monthly Film Bulletin noted that the plotting and staging of the film as "chaotic" while finding that the film was "brightened by occasional moments of unintended hilarity, as when the drugged ambrosia is ritually consumed to the accompaniment of a robust chorus of "The Battle Hymn of the Republic""

From retreospective reviews, the assistant professor Danny Shipka of Louisiana State University described the film as Lenzi capitalizing on public interest in cult leader Jim Jones and referring to it as a "ridiculous film". Online film database AllMovie gave the film a one and a half star out of five rating, noting that the film includes "Stone Age cannibals, a Jim Jones-type cult, hired assassins, and gratuitous animal slaughters thrown onscreen every five minutes just to keep the viewer awake." The review also commented on the themes of the film, stating that "Both of the leading characters are given a backstory of having exploited blacks in their Alabama cotton mill, only to lose all their ill-gotten money and – in one case – pay the ultimate price, as one underclass avenges another half a world away. In more talented hands, there could have been a real statement made with this film. As it turns out, the only statement most viewers are likely to come away with is "yuck."

See also
 List of Italian films of 1980
 List of horror films of 1980

Notes

References

External links
 
 Eaten Alive! trailer is available for free download at the Internet Archive

1980 films
Italian splatter films
Cannibal-boom films
Films directed by Umberto Lenzi
1980 horror films
Italian horror films
Adventure horror films
1980s Italian-language films
Films about missing people
Films produced by Luciano Martino
Films set in Papua New Guinea
1980s Italian films